Valverde is a comune (municipality) in the Province of Pavia in the Italian region Lombardy, located about 70 km south of Milan and about 35 km south of Pavia. As of 31 December 2004, it had a population of 333 and an area of 14.8 km².

Valverde borders the following municipalities: Ruino, Val di Nizza, Varzi, Zavattarello.

Demographic evolution

References

Cities and towns in Lombardy